George Lyall (1779 – 1 September 1853) was an English merchant and politician, Chairman of the Honourable East India Company for periods 1841–3 and 1844–6.

Life
Lyall was the eldest son of John Lyall, a merchant and shipowner, and his wife Jane Comyn; Alfred Lyall and William Rowe Lyall were brothers.

He had a range of other business interests involving shipping. In 1825 he was a director of the New Zealand Company, a venture chaired by the wealthy John George Lambton, Whig MP (and later 1st Earl of Durham), that made the first attempt to colonise New Zealand.

He served as a Conservative Member of Parliament (MP) for the City of London from 1833 to 1835 and again from 1841 to 1847.   He died in Park Crescent, London, Middlesex.

Family
Lyall was married, and with his wife Mary Ann née Edwardes had two sons and two daughters. The other son, John Edwardes Lyall, became Advocate-General of Bengal. Their daughter Mary married William Forsyth QC.

References

External links 
 

1779 births
1853 deaths
Conservative Party (UK) MPs for English constituencies
UK MPs 1832–1835
UK MPs 1841–1847
Directors of the British East India Company
Lyall family